Tiny is an unincorporated community in Dickenson County, Virginia, in the United States.

History
A post office was established at Tiny in 1907, and remained in operation until it was discontinued in 1963. Tiny was likely a descriptive name for its diminutive size.

References

Unincorporated communities in Dickenson County, Virginia
Unincorporated communities in Virginia